Kumaravatha Srinivasa Reddy (born 14 February 1972), better known professionally as Sriman, is an Indian actor who appears primarily in Tamil films, and also some Telugu films. He is primarily known for his prominent character roles in Sethu (1999), Friends (2001) Panchathanthiram (2002), Aayutha Ezhuthu (2004),  Pokkiri (2007), Aegan (2008), Muni 2: Kanchana (2011) and Kanchana 2 (2015). He is the son of noted producer Prakash Reddy.

Early life
Sriman was born as Kumaravatha Srinivasa Reddy on 14 February 1972. His father Karri Prakash reddy is a popular dancer. He also was an assistant dance director, production Executive in his Brothers company. Later he started his production company, in which he produced 24 Telugu and Kannada films.  His mother Jaya Lakshmi is a house wife. He has two siblings, a brother Prabhakaran and a sister Surekha. His uncle K. S. Reddy was the first popular solo Dancer in film industry, popular dance director, acted few films and became film Director. Sriman did his schooling in Bharath Higher Secondary School Teynampet and Adyar. Then shifted to thyagara nagar high school in T.Nagar, He did his degree in Pachaiyappa's College, Chennai. He started his career as child artist in 1975 and was very fond of acting. He learnt Bharathanatyam from dance masters Vasantha, film dancing from Raghuram master, master Sivashankar, master Kala and Vasu master in south Indian artist association premises. . Other than his dancing skills, he is also trained horse rider, well trained in martial arts from master Sekar (Kung fu) and gymnastics silambam from Gopal and Pandian mastersin YMCA. 

With a strong film background, he started his film career as a child artiste in 1975 Telugu film Bangara Manushulu ‘later worked in korada Rani, ’Jothy lakshmi Manishi mrugham, seethamma santhanam, pichodu Pelli,tufan mail,chandi Chamundi,rail dhophedi, till 1984 he performed and returned to continue his academic studies after acting in 17 films directed by ks reddy and mostly produced by his father Prakash Reddy, . After his college studies he recapped his acting crown in Telugu film and Tamil film. In the 90s, he played the hero's friend in several films. He was spotted by director   Geetha krishna for keechu rallu, in tamil director Kasturi Raja Spotted him while dancing in kala masters dance class and introduced in MOUNA MOZHI, produced by late Mr.Eknath, then director Vikraman spotted  and gave him a cameo supporting role in his Tamil film Pudhiya Mannargal. He enacted a supporting role in Priyam, then  Vijay-starrer Love Today, which he considers as a turning point in his career". He has frequently appeared in Kamal Haasan's comedy films during the 2000s, including Pammal K. Sambandam, Panchathantiram Naladhamayanthi,unnaipol oruvan, Manmadan Ambu.

In the mid-2000s, he appeared in a series of lead roles in films with an adult theme including Sorry Enaku Kalyanamayidichu (2005), Unarchigal (2005) and the unreleased Sati Savithri.

Filmography

Tamil films

Telugu films

Television
 Anni
 Comedy Junction
 Pandian Stores
Kelviyin Nayagane

References

External links
 

Indian male film actors
Male actors in Tamil cinema
Living people
Telugu people
1972 births
Male actors from Rajahmundry
Male actors from Chennai
Male actors in Telugu cinema